The Park West School Division is a school district in Manitoba near the border with Saskatchewan. It was formed in 2002 from the merger of the Birdtail River and Pelly Trail School Divisions.

History
The Pelly Trail division made a controversial decision not to allow Manitoba Premier Howard Pawley to address a group of high-school students in 1985.  Trustee Len Derkach argued that the school board "wanted to keep politics out of the school system", although a spokesperson for the premier indicated that the talk would not have been partisan in nature.  The spokesperson added that Pawley had never been refused permission to speak to students before.

References

External links
Official website

School districts in Manitoba
Parkland Region, Manitoba